The Divine Lorraine Hotel, also known as the Lorraine Apartments, stands at the corner of Broad Street and Fairmount Avenue in North Philadelphia, Pennsylvania. Designed by architect Willis G. Hale and built between 1892 and 1894, the building originally functioned as apartments, housing some of Philadelphia's wealthy residents. Lorraine Apartments was one of the most luxurious and best preserved late 19th-century apartment houses in Philadelphia. In 1900 the building became the Lorraine Hotel when the Italian-owned Metropolitan Hotel Company purchased the apartments. Later it would become the first hotel in Philadelphia to be racially integrated under Father Divine.

The hotel was abandoned and deteriorated, with graffiti all over the walls, broken windows, and crumbling stone. On September 16, 2015, a massive renovation project began.

Early history
Both the location of the building and the architecture itself reflect the changes that were occurring rapidly in the city of Philadelphia and in the country at the time. North Philadelphia of the 1880s attracted many of the city's nouveau-riche, those individuals who became wealthy as a result of the Industrial Revolution. The Lorraine was a place of luxurious living, providing apartments with new amenities such as electricity. In addition, the building boasted its own staff, eliminating the need for residents to have private servants. There was also a central kitchen from which meals were delivered to residents.

Reporting on the Philadelphia Phillies' return to Philadelphia in April 1935 from spring training in Florida, the Philadelphia Inquirer wrote, "the Phillies ... steamed into North Philadelphia station and jumped cabs for the Lorraine Hotel, which will be the headquarters of the club until the season opens."

The Lorraine Apartments were also an architectural feat. Prior to this period, the majority of Philadelphia's buildings were low rise, generally being no more than three or four stories tall. Not only were construction materials and techniques not capable of supporting taller buildings, but the inconvenience of the many flights of stairs to get to higher floors in the absence of an elevator was significant. 

The Lorraine, at ten stories tall, was one of the first high-rise apartment buildings in the city. The building's architect, Willis G. Hale, also designed an earlier high-rise apartment building at 22nd and Chestnut Streets, which stood from 1889 until its demolition in 1945. Hale designed many other buildings around the city, but quickly fell out of favor at the turn of the century when most patrons rejected his highly stylized Victorian designs for the sleeker style of modern skyscrapers, and most of his landmarks had been torn down after the Great Depression.

Father Divine and the International Peace Mission Movement

In 1948, the building was sold to Father Divine (Reverend Major Jealous Divine) for $485,000. Father Divine was the leader of the International Peace Mission movement. After purchasing the building, Father Divine renamed it the Divine Lorraine Hotel. His hotel was the first of its class in Philadelphia, or indeed in the United States, to be fully racially integrated. The Divine Lorraine was open to all races and religions, men and women who were willing to follow the rules of the movement. Among others, the rules included no smoking, no drinking, no profanity, and no undue mixing of the sexes, with men and women residing on different floors of the building. Additionally, guests and residents were expected to uphold a certain level of modesty, meaning that women were expected to wear long skirts - pants were not allowed. Believing that all people were equal in the sight of God, Father Divine was involved in many social welfare activities as well. For example, after purchasing the hotel, several parts of it were transformed for public use. The 10th-floor auditorium was converted to a place of worship. The movement also opened the kitchen on the first floor as a public dining room where persons from the community were able to purchase and eat low-cost meals for 25 cents.

The Divine Lorraine received a historical marker from the Pennsylvania Historical and Museum Commission in 1994 and was listed on the National Register of Historic Places in 2002 as a site significant in terms of both architectural and civil rights history.

Abandonment

The building was closed in 1999 and sold in 2000 by the International Peace Mission. In May 2006 it was resold to Lorraine Hotel LP. to be converted into apartments. Development never came to fruition but furnishings were sold while floors, paneling, and other architectural items were removed by salvage companies. The building was reduced to a hollow shell, covered with graffiti, with windows boarded up or open to the weather.

The Universal Peace Mission Movement still exists in the form of a network of independent churches, businesses, and religious orders. Its followers operated another hotel, the Divine Tracy in West Philadelphia, which they sold in 2006.  It is now the Axis Apartments.

Redevelopment
In October 2012 the property was transferred to developer Eric Blumenfeld at the city's monthly Sheriff's sale, with Blumenfeld being the sole bidder.  He gained control of the site in a two-step process: first, for an undisclosed price, he paid an outstanding note on the property from the New York-based Amalgamated Bank. Then he paid off city taxes and other liens. The value of both the mortgage and liens was $8,054,104.39.

In February 2015 the developer announced renovation plans to convert the building into rental units with restaurants on the ground level pending closing on financing. As of May 2015 construction lighting was installed in the empty hotel and Procida Funding & Advisors agreed to lend $31.5M USD in construction funding. In August the Philadelphia Historical Commission approved the plans which will restore the building to its 1933 appearance. As of June 2016 a new rooftop "Divine Lorraine" sign had been installed and some interior apartments were nearing completion.

As of April 2022, the Divine Lorraine is planned to turn back into a hotel.

References

External links

Developer Official Site
Photoessay and history of the Divine Lorraine
Father Divine's International Peace Mission Movement
Philadelphia City Paper photo essay
Listing and photographs at the Historic American Buildings Survey
Photograph of the Divine Lorraine by James G. Mundie

Hotel buildings completed in 1894
Residential buildings on the National Register of Historic Places in Philadelphia
Hotels established in 1900
Poplar, Philadelphia